RDF may refer to:

Science and technology
 Radio direction finder, a device used in aircraft for navigation
 Radio direction finding, techniques used when searching for radio sources
 Random dopant fluctuation
 Real degree of fermentation, attenuation of alcoholic beverages
 Reduced dimensions form, a canonical mechanism for solving two-state trajectories
 Refuse-derived fuel
 Resource Description Framework, an official W3C Recommendation for Semantic Web data models
 RDF Schema, the knowledge representation language used in this framework
 Relative directivity factor, a figure of merit for directional receiving antennas
 Radial distribution function, describes how density varies as a function of distance from a reference particle

Art, entertainment, and media
 Radical Dance Faction, a band from the United Kingdom
 RDF Media, a television production company
 Robotech Defense Force, a character group in the US anime television series Robotech
 Rapid Deployment Force: Global Conflict, a video game

Military
 Reserve Defence Forces, the combined military reserve force of Ireland
 Rwandan Defence Forces
 Rapid Deployment Force (United States)

Organizations
 Reichsbund Deutsche Familie, Kampfbund für erbtüchtigen Kinderreichtum, a German Nazi organisation
 Richard Dawkins Foundation for Reason and Science, UK

Other uses
 Reality distortion field, a term coined to describe Steve Jobs' charisma